Below is a list of leaders of present-day Turkmenistan since the establishment of Turkmen SSR in 1925.

Turkmen Soviet Socialist Republic (1925–1991)

First Secretaries of the Communist Party of Turkmenistan
Ivan Mezhlauk (19 November 1924 – 1926) (acting until 20 February 1925)
Shaymardan Ibragimov (June 1926 – 1927)
Nikolay Paskutsky (1927 – 1928)
Grigory Aronshtam (11 May 1928 – August 1930)
Yakov Popok (August 1930 – 15 April 1937)
Anna Muhamedov (April – October 1937)
Yakov Chubin (October 1937 – November 1939)
Mikhail Fonin (November 1939 – March 1947)
Shaja Batyrov (March 1947 – July 1951)
Suhan Babayev (July 1951 – 14 December 1958)
Jumadurdy Karayev (14 December 1958 – 4 May 1960)
Balysh Ovezov (13 June 1960 – 24 December 1969)
Muhammetnazar Gapurow (24 December 1969 – 21 December 1985)
Saparmurat Niyazov (21 December 1985 – 16 December 1991)

Turkmenistan (1990–present)
The first column consecutively numbers the individuals who have served as president, while the second column consecutively numbers the presidential terms or administrations.

Timeline

National Leader
On 21 January 2023, President Serdar Berdimuhamedow appointed his father, former President Gurbanguly Berdimuhamedow, chairman of the People's Council of Turkmenistan with the title "National Leader".

See also
Politics of Turkmenistan
Cabinet of Turkmenistan
People's Council of Turkmenistan
President of Turkmenistan
Prime Minister of Turkmenistan
Vice President of Turkmenistan

References

Heads of state of Turkmenistan
Politics of Turkmenistan
Government of Turkmenistan
Turkmenistan